PokerGO is an over-the-top content platform based in Las Vegas, Nevada. PokerGO was launched in 2017 as a subscription-based streaming service offering poker centric online streaming.

The content offered on PokerGO includes poker tournaments, along with cash game-orientated shows.

As of February 2021, PokerGO's library of content includes over 2,400 videos totaling over 3,800 continuous hours.

Content 
The content of PokerGO includes shows, tournament replays, and cash games. Other media includes episodes, live streams, and recap videos, and events that were streamed live become on-demand videos afterward.

Poker tournaments and cash games

High Stakes Poker 
High Stakes Poker is a cash game poker television program that sees a mix of professional and amateur poker players playing high stakes No-Limit Hold’em with buy-ins ranging from $100,000 to $500,000.

The show debuted in January 2006 and ran for seven seasons until May 2011. In February 2020, PokerGO announced that they had acquired the High Stakes Poker brand and assets. In December 2020, a new season of High Stakes Poker aired on PokerGO and included returning players Tom Dwan, Phil Hellmuth, Brandon Adams, and Phil Ivey, while also introducing new players to High Stakes Poker including Jason Koon, Jean-Robert Bellande, Bryn Kenney, Doug Polk, Michael Schwimer, and Chamath Palihapitiya.

There are nine seasons of High Stakes Poker and 126 episodes, and current hosts include Gabe Kaplan and A.J. Benza.

Poker After Dark 
Poker After Dark takes an intimate look at one table as it develops over a series of episodes. The seasons were split into weeks with each given a theme based on the players involved. Poker After Dark originally began under a No-Limit Hold’em sit-n-go format before evolving to cash games that also featured different game variations such as Pot-Limit Omaha, 2-7 Triple Draw, H.O.R.S.E., or Short Deck.

The original series would see one table play over five episodes with the sixth episode being a director's cut. When the show was acquired in 2017, it was rebooted as a live stream show for four seasons before returning to the episodic format for season 12.

World Series of Poker 
The World Series of Poker (WSOP) is a series of tournaments of most major poker variants that have been held annually in Las Vegas since 1970. The WSOP expanded to Europe in 2007, and Asia Pacific in 2012.

PokerGO acquired the global television and digital media rights to the WSOP in 2017. The agreement included the expansion of programming in a shared deal that saw live coverage on both ESPN and PokerGO. In 2020, WSOP Classic was added to the PokerGO library that included footage from both the WSOP Main Event and WSOP bracelet events from 2003—2010.

Super High Roller Bowl 
The Super High Roller Bowl is a recurring high-stakes No-Limit Hold’em poker tournaments held around the world since 2015. After beginning in Las Vegas, the Super High Roller Bowl has expanded to Macau, London, Bahamas, Australia, and Russia, as well as having an online event on partypoker in 2020.

U.S. Poker Open 
The U.S. Poker Open is a poker tournament series held in the PokerGO Studio since 2018. The series features a variety of events at different buy-in amounts and crowns a series champion each year. Previous series champions include Stephen Chidwick (2018) and David Peters (2019).

Poker Masters 
Held since 2017, the Poker Masters is a poker tournament series held in the PokerGO Studio. The series awards a Purple Jacket to the overall champion, and winners include Steffen Sontheimer (2017), Ali Imsirovic (2018), and Sam Soverel (2019). In 2020, the event moved online to partypoker, and Alexandros Kolonias won the championship.

Additional poker tournaments and cash games 
Additional poker tournament coverage and cash games available on PokerGO include:

 High Stakes Duel
 High Stakes Feud
PokerGO Cup
 Dolly's Game
 Rob's Home Game
 Friday Night Poker
 Super High Roller Cash Game
 British Poker Open
 Australian Poker Open
 World Poker Tour
 Partypoker MILLIONS
 Aussie Millions
 ARIA High Roller Series
 Super High Roller Celebrity Shootout
 Doubles Poker Championship
 Face the Ace
 Poker Central Celebrity Shootout

Original programming

Pokerography 
Pokerography is a series of biopic episodes that tells the story behind players and outlines their life and poker career. There are 23 episodes of Pokerography, and some of the players featured include Antonio Esfandiari, Chris Moneymaker, Jennifer Tilly, Mike Sexton, and Phil Hellmuth.

Super High Roller Club 
Presented by Ali Nejad, the six-part Super High Roller Club series gives viewers a glimpse into the lives of poker players as they tell stories from the felt and from life. The players involved include Brandon Adams, Nick Schulman, Farah Galfond, Antonio Esfandiari, Phil Hellmuth, and Daniel Negreanu.

Real Talk 
This roundtable talk show format for Real Talk is hosted by Remko Rinkema as he discusses with poker players a wide variety of topics. The players involved include Scott Blumstein, Liv Boeree, Matt Berkey, Kane Kalas, Bryn Kenney, Bryon Kaverman, Justin Bonomo, Isaac Haxton, Maria Ho, Jason Koon, Greg Merson, and Mike Sexton.

The Big Blind 
The strategy of poker mixed with a trivia show format is the concept behind The Big Blind as Jeff Platt hosts three contestants each week as they are tested on their knowledge of Las Vegas, casinos, gambling, and poker.

Legends of the Game 
This six-part docu series provides a closer look at legendary gamblers and poker's most defining characters as Benny Binion, Stu Ungar, and David “Chip” Reese are a few of the subjects on Legends of the Game.

Dead Money 
Dead Money follows poker professional Matt Berkey as he prepares to play the 2016 Super High Roller Bowl. Although predominantly a cash game player, Berkey is set to play his biggest buy-in poker tournament of $300,000, and Dead Money gives viewers a unique look into his strategy and decision-making on the way to him finishing in fifth-place for $1,100,000.

Additional programming 
Additional programming available on PokerGO include:

 The Championship Run
 Stories from the Felt
 Deep Issues
 Beyond the Rail
 Major Wager
 INSIDERS: Super High Roller Bowl 2018
 2020 Hindsight
 Hand Histories
 Inside Poker
 Poker Nights
 Tell Tale
 Chasing Hearts
 Grinders

Device support and technical details

Devices 
PokerGO can be accessed via an internet browser on PCs, tablets, or mobile phones, while PokerGO apps are available on various platforms, including Apple iPhone, Apple iPad, Apple TV, android mobile and tablet devices, Roku devices, and Amazon Fire TV. PokerGO is available worldwide except in China.

Service plans 
PokerGO launched with two subscription plans of either monthly or an annual option. PokerGO subscription plans are currently divided into three price tiers of monthly, quarterly, or annual.

PokerGO Studio 

It was announced in April 2018 that the building of the 10,000 square-foot PokerGO Studio would be located at ARIA Resort & Casino. The state-of-the-art studio is the home to PokerGO-owned live events that are streamed on PokerGO and would have space for nine poker tables and occupancy of up to 300 people. The PokerGO Studio includes space for fans and spectators, a full-service bar, a lounge for seating, and the flexibility to host a wide variety of events.

The PokerGO Studio opened in May 2018 with the filming of Poker After Dark. Open House week featured two nights of $100/$200 No-Limit Hold’em cash games with players including Daniel Negreanu, Maria Ho, Brandon Adams, Eli Elezra, Bill Perkins, Dan Shak, Mike Matusow, Matt Berkey, Tom Marchese, Antonio Esfandiari, and Phil Hellmuth.

The first tournament series at the PokerGO Studio was held later that month with the 2018 Super High Roller Bowl attracting 48 players. Justin Bonomo defeated Daniel Negreanu heads-up to win the $5,000,000 first-place prize and his second Super High Roller Bowl title.

Poker 
The PokerGO Studio is the home for PokerGO-owned live events from poker tournaments to cash games.

The Super High Roller Bowl, U.S. Poker Open, and Poker Masters tournament series' have been held inside the PokerGO Studio since 2018, and new PokerGO shows of High Stakes Duel and High Stakes Feud were filmed in the PokerGO Studio. It has also hosted World Poker Tour final tables including the WPT Bobby Baldwin Classic and WPT Five Diamond World Poker Classic.

The PokerGO Studio also hosts cash games including Poker After Dark, High Stakes Poker, Friday Night Poker, Dolly's Game, and Rob's Home Game. Poker After Dark originally filmed at South Point Casino, Golden Nugget, and ARIA Resort & Casino, before relocating to the PokerGO Studio during Season 9. High Stakes Poker originally filmed at the Golden Nugget, The Palms, South Point Casino, and the Bellagio Resort & Casino, before relocating to the PokerGO Studio when the show relaunched after a nearly 10-year hiatus for Season 8.

Other poker events held from inside the PokerGO Studio include the Global Poker Awards.

References 

Streaming media systems
Gambling in the United States
Internet streaming services
Poker companies
2017 establishments in Nevada
Companies based in Las Vegas
Entertainment companies established in 2017
Internet television streaming services
Subscription video on demand services